Beach woodball competition at the 2016 Asian Beach Games was held in Da Nang, Vietnam from 25 September to 2 October 2016 at Son Thuy Beach, Da Nang, Vietnam.

Medalists

Stroke

Fairway

Medal table

Results

Stroke

Men's singles
30 September – 2 October

Men's team
30 September – 1 October

Women's singles
30 September – 2 October

Women's team
30 September – 1 October

Fairaway

Men's singles
25 September

Men's doubles
26 September

Men's team
29 September

Women's singles
25 September

Women's doubles
26 September

Women's team
28 September

Mixed doubles
27 September

References

External links 
Official website

2016 Asian Beach Games events
2016